Río Limpio is a town in the Elías Piña province of the Dominican Republic.

Sources 
 – World-Gazetteer.com

Populated places in Elías Piña Province